Jan Tore Amundsen (born 12 April 1983 in Kongsvinger) is a Norwegian footballer who most recently played for Ullensaker/Kisa IL.

Club career
Jan Tore Amundsen came to Odd Grenland from Urædd before the 2002 season.

In April 2005 he got his first match for Norway national under-21 football team against Slovakia. In his second match he scored a goal against Belarus after only 6 minutes 

His only goal for the team came when he scored against Vålerenga Fotball in 2006.

In 2007, Amundsen got voted the third worst player in Tippeligaen by several Norwegian online newspapers, the worst player and second worst player was Odd Greanland teammates Fernando de Ornelas and Zbyněk Pospěch

In February 2009, Jan Tore Amundsen signed a contract with Notodden FK  and signed than on 16. December 2009 for FK Tønsberg.

After the 2018 season, Amundsen left Ullensaker/Kisa.

References

External links

1983 births
Living people
Norwegian footballers
Odds BK players
Notodden FK players
FK Tønsberg players
Strømmen IF players
Ullensaker/Kisa IL players
Eliteserien players
Norwegian First Division players
Sportspeople from Kongsvinger
Norway youth international footballers
Norway under-21 international footballers
Association football midfielders